The Balboa Theatre is a historic vaudeville/movie theatre in downtown San Diego, US, built in 1924. Listed on the National Register of Historic Places in 1996, the Balboa was refurbished (beginning in 2005) and reopened as a performing arts venue in 2008.

History
The Balboa was built by businessman Robert E. Hicks, architect William H. Wheeler, by the Wurster Construction Company for $800,000 in 1924. A grand vaudeville/movie palace combining Moorish and Spanish Revival styles, the single-balcony theatre originally had a seating capacity of 1,513; waterfalls on either side of the proscenium arch provided air cooling.

As part of the Fox West Coast circuit, the Balboa featured live vaudeville and movies, accompanied by orchestra and organ. An article from the American Theatre Organ Society states that Edward Swan was the organist at the Balboa Theatre in 1925-26 and he claims that the original 426 pipe Robert Morton organ was the finest he had ever played. It had an echo organ over the balcony.  He “played the features while the small orchestra did the vaudeville segments.  Sometimes Ed also played the organ or piano with the orchestra and his playing time lengthened to 10 or 12 hours a day.”  In 1930 the theatre was upgraded for sound pictures and a new neon marquee was added. In 1934, it was remodeled, reopening as Teatro Balboa, featuring Spanish-language films. The theatre's office space was converted to housing for the U.S. Navy during World War II.
 

After the war, Balboa languished as a movie house and in 1959 was purchased by the Russo family. Because of its rich history and splendid architecture the Balboa was designated as a local historic site in 1972. Although the 1973 Horton Plaza Redevelopment Plan called for complete restoration of the building as a theatre, the City of San Diego instead condemned it; the Centre City Development Corporation (CCDC) made plans to gut the theatre for commercial space, intending to strip the interior and build four floors of retail space.

Restoration
In 1985, a small group of advocates led by Steve Karo formed the Save Our Balboa Organization to lobby against destruction of the theatre and to support its restoration. The Save Our Balboa group garnered public support and eventually prevailed in a long and hard-fought effort to stop destruction of the theatre. The Save Our Balboa Organization developed into the Balboa Theatre Foundation which continued lobbying for restoration and in 1996, succeeded in listing the Balboa Theatre on the National Register of Historic Places. After twenty years, CCDC did a turnaround and decided to fund a complete restoration which began in 2005. They not only funded, at a cost of $26.5 million, but superbly managed the project, working with restoration architects Westlake Reed Leskosky, now DLR Group. The theatre re-opened in 2008 and is now an excellent venue for live theatre and concerts.

In 2009, after extensive renovation, the Balboa Theatre Foundation rededicated a 1929 Wonder Morton organ, one of only four such organs in the world. The Foundation purchased, restored and relocated the 4-manual, 23-rank organ from Pennsylvania to the Balboa Theatre after a five-year-long restoration. The original Robert Morton organ was moved to the Fox Theatre in 1929, which is now Copley Symphony Hall.

Current use
The Balboa Theatre now hosts the Mainly Mozart Festival, special events, and touring companies of Broadway productions. The city of San Diego holds the annual "State of the City" address at the theatre.

References

External links

 Balboa Theatre at Cinema Treasures 

National Register of Historic Places in San Diego
Theatres on the National Register of Historic Places in California
Theatres completed in 1924
Performing arts centers in California
Culture of San Diego
Buildings and structures in San Diego
Public venues with a theatre organ